Darcy (or variant forms Darci, Darcie, or Darcey), lit.  "From the Fortress", or "Dark(-haired) One", is a surname from the Norman barony of Arcy, La Manche, in what was once Normandy, a duchy/dukedom under the French king), but is now Northern France. The surname became very popular in the English language after the Norman conquest of England; while more popular as a surname, it does have some popularity as a given name.  Derived given names include girl's names like Darcene. The surname is also applied as an anglicization for the Gaelic surname Ó Dorchaidhe. 

People with this surname include:
 Conyers Darcy (c. 1685–1758), British politician and courtier
 Dame Darcy, American graphic artist, cartoonist, and musician
 Eamonn Darcy (born 1952), Irish golfer
 Elizabeth Darcy, Countess of Ormond (3 April 1332 – 24 March 1390)
 Elizabeth Darcy, Countess of Rivers and Viscountess of Savage (1581 – 9 March 1650)
 Elizabeth Darcy, nursemaid of then-infant Arthur, Prince of Wales (firstborn son of Henry VII of King Henry VII of England).  
 Emma Darcy, pseudonym of Australian husband and wife writers Frank and Wendy Brennan
 Henry Darcy (1803–1858), French scientist who made several important contributions to hydraulics and hydrogeology and for whom the unit of permeability is named
 John Darcy, 1st Baron Darcy de Knayth (1290–1347), English peer and Lord Justiciar of Ireland
 Judy Darcy (born 1950), Danish health care advocate, trade unionist, and politician.
 Les Darcy (1895–1917), Australian boxer
 Luke Darcy (born 1975), former Australian rules footballer
 Robert Darcy, 4th Earl of Holderness (1718–1778), British diplomat and politician
 Susan Darcy (born 1956), American test pilot
 Thomas Darcy, 1st Baron Darcy de Darcy (c. 1467 – 30 June 1537), an English nobleman convicted of high treason and executed for his role in the Pilgrimage of Grace

Fictional Characters 
 Elizabeth Darcy, the female protagonist in Jane Austen's novel Pride and Prejudice.
 Mr. Fitzwilliam Darcy, Esquire, the male protagonist in Jane Austen's novel, Pride and Prejudice.

See also
 D'arcy (name)
 
 Darcy (disambiguation)